Mokretsevo is a rural locality (a village) in Krasnopolyanskoye Rural Settlement, Nikolsky District, Vologda Oblast, Russia. The population was 75 as of 2002. There are 2 streets.

Geography 
Mokretsevo is located 6 km north of Nikolsk (the district's administrative centre) by road. Zhivotovo is the nearest rural locality.

References 

Rural localities in Nikolsky District, Vologda Oblast